Moses Nakintije Ssekibogo (January 25, 1985 – February 1, 2018), also known as Mowzey Radio, sometimes referred to as Moses Radio, was a Ugandan musician. He was one of the main performers of the Ugandan music group Goodlyfe Crew together with Jose Chameleone's brother Weasel Manizo (real name Douglas Sseguya).

Career
Born and raised in Jinja District of Busoga Sub region, Moses Radio attended Kibuye Primary school in Makindye and later, Holy Cross Lake View Jinja for his O-Levels and later Kiira College Butiki for A-Levels before joining Makerere University where he graduated with a Bachelor's degree in Community Sociology in 2005. 
Radio released his first solo song, "Tujja Kuba Wamu" in 2004 while at Makerere University where he completed a degree in psychology, before joining the Leone Island Music Empire in 2005. He started as a backup singer along with Weasel behind Jose Chameleone. He had first success in the year 2005 after he had released a reggae love song called "Jennifer"; the official stage video for that song was filmed by Ugandan music promoter DJ Erycom.

In 2006, Mowzey Radio released another song titled "Sweet Lady", another well-received song that introduced him to a large fan base in Uganda. In October 2007, Mowzey Radio, Weasel and Jose Chameleone toured the United States and the Caribbean. Before they returned home, Radio and Weasel had misunderstandings with Jose Chameleone. Following disagreements between Jose Chameleone and the two, they quit the group and formed Goodlyfe Crew, which became successful. Their first song was "Nakudata", followed by "Ngamba" and others. He made music collaborations with musicians such as Rabadaba in the song "Ability" together with Weasel, produced by Just Jose.

In his singing career he did collaborations with both local and international artists winning awards and several nominations including the BET nominations.

Radio and Weasel had many hits, including: "Ability", "Akapapula", "Bread and Butter", "Hellenah" ft David Lutalo, "Juice Juicy", "Lwaki Onnumya", "Magnetic", "Mr DJ", "Mukama Talya Mandazi", "Ngenda Maaso", "Nyambula", "Nyumbani", "Obudde", "Potential", "Sitaani", "Zuena", and "(Tukikole) Neera", which played incessantly on most radio and TV stations in Africa in 2014.

BET award nomination. 
.Mowzey Radio and his musical partner Weasel were nominated in the category of "Best International Act Africa" at the BET Awards in 2013. This nomination was in recognition of their chart-topping single "Magnetic", which had gained significant popularity since its release in 2012. The duo was nominated alongside other notable African artists, including Ice Prince Zamani, Toya Delazy, Donald, and R2Bees. Although they did not emerge as winners, the nomination marked a significant milestone in their music career, garnering them increased international recognition.

Later life and death
Radio died on 1 February 2018 at Case Clinic in Kampala, Uganda, from a blood clot in his brain sustained in a bar brawl in Entebbe a few days earlier. He was laid to rest at Kagga-Nakawuka in Wakiso District.
And till now Radio is remembered in the last week of January.

HiPipo Music Awards

Radio is a fifteen-time HiPipo Music Awards Winner. Below are the categories he won.

20186th HiPipo Music Awards winner
 Best Duo/Group Radio and Weasel
 Song Of The Year (Uganda) Radio & Weasel & B2CGutamiiza
 Best Song Writer Moses Radio

20175th HiPipo Music Awards winner
 Song of the Year South Sudan 
 Sambala by MB Law and Rhapsody Ft Radio & Weasel

20164th HiPipo Music Awards winner
 Best Music GroupRadio and Weasel
 Song Of The YearJuicy by Radio and Weasel
 Best Song WriterMoses Radio

20153rd HiPipo Music Awards winner
 Best Duo/Group ArtistRadio And Weasel
 Album Of The YearAmaaso Ntunga By Radio And Weasel
 Song Of The YearNeeraRadio And Weasel
 Best Rnb Song NeeraRadio And Weasel
 The Best Duo-Group Artist: Radio and Weasel
 The Album of the Year: Obudde AlbumRadio and Weasel

20142nd HiPipo Music Awards winner
 The Best Duo/Group Artist: Radio and Weasel
 The Album of the Year: Obudde AlbumRadio and Weasel

See also
 Lillian Mbabazi
 List of Ugandan musicians
Edited and uploaded by

References

1983 births
2018 deaths
Makerere University alumni
Ugandan songwriters
People from Eastern Region, Uganda
People educated at Kiira College Butiki